Pikes Peak International Raceway (PPIR) is a racetrack in the Colorado Springs area within the city limits of Fountain, Colorado, that by October 12, 1997, was "the fastest 1-mile paved oval anywhere".  The speedway hosted races in several series including the Indy Racing League and two NASCAR series (Busch and Truck) until operations were suspended from August 2005. A wide variety of amateur racing groups use PPIR for racing and training as the circuit is now closed to sanctioned professional auto racing due to the purchase of the track by PPIR LLC from NASCAR/ISC in 2008 after the track was put up for sale in 2006. The sale included a clause that prohibited sanctioned professional auto racing, as well as the need for additional safety upgrades at a cost of $1 million+ for professional racing series that the new ownership had no interest in implementing with the clause in place.

History
Racing in the Pikes Peak Region included 19th century horse tracks (e.g., to the west of Colorado Springs'  Palmer House along Fountain Creek by 1882 and to the north by 1903, the "Roswell Racing Park"), and the annual Pikes Peak International Hill Climb started in 1916 on the 1915 Pikes Peak Highway.  In 1938, a track was north of the Alexander Aircraft factory and  another was to the factory's southeast at the south end of the Nichols Field taxiway.  On the Pike's Peak Ocean-to-Occan Highway west of the city was the end of the 1951 Colorado sports car rally (terminus at the Crystola Inn), a 1953 dirt dragstrip "some four miles east of Colorado Springs" was used for "the first statewide drag race", and a stock car track was along Powers Road in the early 1960s.  The "last local track" for auto racing east of the city through the late 1970s was the Colorado Springs International Speedway which "had crowds in the 3,000-4,000 range on summer weekends".  The Platte Avenue go-kart track closed , the greyhound track closed  and is now an off track betting facility, and the Olympic velodrome in Memorial Park is one of the remaining racing venues within the city.

Pikes Peak Meadows
After its horse racing ended in 1993, C. C. Myers "announced plans in May 1996 to build a major auto racing facility" at Pikes Peak Meadows.

Speedway development
In 1997, "Apollo Real Estate Advisors LP formed a joint venture January 30 with Raceway Associates, a partnership headed by California contractor and developer C.C. Myers Inc, to own and run the 1,300-acre" speedway complex. The first race's attendance (June 8) was 16,810, the Richard Petty Driving Experience used PPIR from July 2–17, the first IRL Series race on June 28 was televised, and a Winston West 500K race was held in July 1997.

International Speedway Corporation

Earlier in 1996, a competing track near Denver in Adams County, Colorado was attempted by Penske Motorsports, Inc. which merged in 1999 with the International Speedway Corporation. In 2002 ISC gained "the right of first refusal should PPIR owners decide to sell their 1,200-acre complex" and in October 2005 for $11 million, "bought out the owners of Pikes Peak International Raceway" (racing operations were suspended  and the scoreboard was moved to Texas Motor Speedway.)  In 2006, meetings "between attorneys representing [Commerce City, near Denver] and International Speedway Corporation" were conducted before ISC "announced in February [1997] that it was eyeing land in Commerce City as well as eastern Aurora for the track. It envision[ed] a $360 million to $400 million track and stadium that could hold 75,000 to 80,000 fans." A new opposition group, Commerce City Citizens and Business Alliance, endorsed anti-raceway candidates which won local elections, and in May 1997 "ISC executive Wesley Harris said the 1,300-acre parcel the company was considering near Denver International Airport was not compatible with its needs".  ISC sold PPIR in November 2006 (the purchase closed in the first quarter of 2007), and PPIR operations resumed in 2008.

Current races
On December 6, 2012, USAC announced that PPIR would be on the 2013 USAC Traxxas Silver Crown Series schedule.  Pikes Peak International Raceway would host the richest event in SRL Southwest Tour history as announced on April 23, 2013.  PPIR also hosts regional club road course races such as the National Auto Sport Association (NASA) and SCCA as well as local enthusiast events such as track days, drifting events, and car shows.

PPIR currently hosts the largest autocross racing series in the Rocky Mountain Region, PPIR Time Attack. The series consists of 8-10 races per year on varying courses on the infield of the track. Courses run from 40 seconds to 1min 5 secs with competitors taking five runs to best their times. The series is based on weight to power and drivetrain classes, including front wheel drive, rear wheel drive, all-wheel drive and a XX class for non-conforming cars or non-street-legal cars.

Lap Records

The fastest official race lap records at Pikes Peak International Raceway are listed as:

Race results

References

External links

NASCAR tracks
Sports venues in Colorado Springs, Colorado
IndyCar Series tracks
Motorsport venues in Colorado
Defunct horse racing venues in the United States
IMSA GT Championship circuits
Buildings and structures in El Paso County, Colorado
Tourist attractions in El Paso County, Colorado
Sports venues completed in 1997
1997 establishments in Colorado